Joseph Sugar Baly  (1816 – 25 March 1890) was an English doctor and entomologist.

Born in Warwick where he would also die, Baly was a specialist in Coleoptera: Phytophaga. His collection is in the Natural History Museum, London. One of the many species he described was Stethopachys formosa.

Works

 Catalogue of the Hispidae in the Collection of the British Museum.
 (with George Champion) Insecta. Coleoptera. Phytophaga (part). Vol. VI, Pt. 2 (1885-1894) Biologia Centrali-Americana

References

 Anthony Musgrave (1932). Bibliography of Australian Entomology, 1775–1930, with biographical notes on authors and collectors, Royal Zoological Society of News South Wales (Sydney) : viii + 380.
 Anonym 1889-1890: [Baly, J. S.] Proc. Linn. Soc. London, London 92-93 
 Sharp, D. 1890: [Baly, J. S.] L'Entomologiste 23 176, 197-200 
 Sharp, D. 1890: [Baly, J. S.] Entomologist's Monthly Magazine (3) 1

External links
Portrait,other details

1816 births
1890 deaths
English coleopterists
People from Warwick
19th-century English medical doctors
Members of the Royal College of Surgeons
Fellows of the Linnean Society of London